Anatoly Yakovlevich Taranetz (3 July 1910 – 10 December 1941) was a Soviet Russian ichthyologist, notable for his contribution to the study of ichthyofauna of the North Pacific and Far Eastern seas of Russia.

Notable dates

 Spring 1929 - Graduated from the Vladivostok Industrial College (now Vladivostok Shipbuilding College) and became 
 Spring 1929 - Observer in the raw materials sector of the Pacific Fisheries Research Center (TINRO-Center, part of the Far Eastern Branch of the Russian Academy of Sciences)
 1932 - Marine Researcher, TIRH Complex Pacific Expedition of the State Hydrological Institute and the Pacific Committee of the Russian Academy of Sciences
 1933 - Started work at the Leningrad Zoological Institute
 1934 - Defended his thesis on "Freshwater fish of the North-Western basin in the Sea of Japan"
 1934 - Participated in the expedition to Sahalin
 1939 - Leader of a group for the study of salmon
 Beginning of 1941 - Editor of the Guide to the fishing industry of the Far East
 November 10, 1941 - Drafted into the army
 December 1941- His echelon is destroyed by enemy aircraft

Biography

Taranetz conducted his later research (1938-1941) on the Amur River, paying special attention to the methodology of studying the yield of any one generation of salmon and its dependence upon hydrological and other factors.

Taranetz produced about 30 published works, including a series of articles on the ichthyofauna of Amur River, and over 20 manuscripts devoted to both individual species and genera of fish, and ichthyofauna of various areas of the Far East.

Selected publications

List of taxa named in honour of A.Y. Taranetz

Chordata
 Arhynchobatidae: Rhinoraja taranetzi (Dolganov, 1983)
 Salmonidae: Salvelinus taranetzi (Kaganowsky, 1955)
 Zoarcidae: Taranetzella lyoderma (Andriashev, 1952)
 Cottidae: Radulinopsis taranetzi (Yabe & Maruyama, 2001)

See also
:Category:Taxa named by Anatoly Yakovlevich Taranetz

References and bibliography

Further reading
 Andriashev A.P. (1937) A contribution to the knowledge of the fishes from the Bering and Chukchi Seas. Issled. Morei SSSR 25 (Issled. Dal'nevostoch Morei 5), Leningrad (Lanz L., Wilimovsky N.J. (transl.) 1955, US Fish Wildl Serv Spec Sci Rep Fish 145)

1910 births
1941 deaths
Soviet ichthyologists
Soviet military personnel killed in World War II